Battle of Azaz may refer to:
 Battle of Azaz (1030), a battle between the Mirdasids of Aleppo and the Byzantines
 Battle of Azaz (1125), a battle between the Crusaders and the Seljuk Turks and other Muslims
 Battle of Azaz (2012), a battle of the Syrian uprising

See also
 Azaz